District Unknown was a psychedelic metal band from Kabul, Afghanistan. Formed in 2009, it is thought to be the first heavy metal band from the region. After a number of changes, the band's final lineup Lemar and Qais decided to disband in 2019.

History
District Unknown was formed in 2009 by cousins Lemar and Qais and brothers Qasem and Pedram through filmmaker Travis Beard. Originally starting as a doom/thrash metal band, the quartet began experimenting with psychedelic music in order to carve out their own sound. Originally playing small shows with a series of covers and original songs "The Nightmare" and "The Dying Bride", threats towards the band began arriving from ultra-conservative and Taliban militants who were opposed to the group making music, so the band had to play in secret, wearing masks and not revealing their names. In 2011, the band experienced a change in lineup with Lemar moving abroad, with Sason and Fa'ez joining the band to bolster the lineup, and Nasir Ahmad of Afghan pop group Arian joining temporarily on keyboards. After stopping wearing masks, the band began to gather attention from international media outlets who gained an interest in their story, such as the BBC, CBS, and Rolling Stone. 2012 saw further changes in the band as District Unknown reverted briefly to a 4 piece band, with Yo Khalifa joining as the new lead vocalist. Later in 2012, the banded added 5th member singer/songwriter Sulleiman Omar on keyboards and backing vocals. In August 2014 the band released their debut album, Anatomy of a 24 Hour Lifetime, and in June 2015 the band, along with documentary film Martyrs of Metal, won the Global Metal Award at the Metal Hammer Golden Gods Awards, held in London on June 15, 2015; the film was eventually retitled Rockabul.

In 2016, guitarist Qais left the band. The band regrouped with Sulleiman Omar taking over guitars and released new track "64" on July 8. The song was written primarily by Sulleiman Omar with bassist Qasem and differed from the style and quality of the band's previous releases. In September 2016 of the same year, the song was featured in Loudwire's list of "10 Awesome Metal Bands From Surprising Countries" and was received well. It continues to garner steady support long after the group disbanded.

In January 2019, frontman Yo Khalifa and guitarist Sulleiman Omar announced they had left the band to start post-progressive metal band Afreet, which released its debut self-titled EP in March 2019. District Unknown's Facebook page was subsequently deleted and the band was presumed to be dissolved by founding members Pedram and Qasem Foushanji, although no official statement has been made.

Former members
Lemar Saifullah - lead guitar, clean vocals (2009-2010)
Qais Shaqasi - rhythm guitar (2009-2012)
Nasir Ahmad - keyboards (2010-2011)
Sasan Fanoon - lead guitar, backing vocals (2011-2012)
Fa'ez Soltani - lead vocals, keyboards, violin, cello (2011-2012)
Yusef "Yo Khalifa" Ahmad Shah - lead vocals, keyboards (2012–2019)
Sulleiman Omar - lead guitar, keyboards, backing vocals (2012–2019)

Discography
Anatomy of a 24 Hour Lifetime (2014)

In film
2018 - RocKabul by Australian documentary film director Travis Beard. The film relates the history of the band from its formation until its members dispersed to different parts of the world.

References

External links
Official Website

2008 establishments in Afghanistan
Afghan rock music groups
Musical groups established in 2008
Progressive metal musical groups
Psychedelic rock music groups